Joseph Samuel is an Indian Politician Member of Legislative Assembly of Tamil Nadu. He was elected from Ambattur  as a Dravida Munnetra Kazhagam candidate in 2021.

Electoral performance

References 

Tamil Nadu MLAs 2021–2026
Dravida Munnetra Kazhagam politicians
Living people
Year of birth missing (living people)